Krasavino is a rural locality (a village) in Samotovinskoye Rural Settlement, Velikoustyugsky District, Vologda Oblast, Russia. The population was 49 as of 2002.

Geography 
Krasavino is located 42 km southwest of Veliky Ustyug (the district's administrative centre) by road. Vlasovo is the nearest rural locality.

References 

Rural localities in Velikoustyugsky District